Woodsdale is an unincorporated community in Person County, in the U.S. state of North Carolina. As of 2020, it has a population of 1,350.

Geography
Woodsdale is located at 36.489863°N latitude and -78.9597327°W longitude. Its elevation sits at 515 feet (157 m). It is situated 3.4 miles southwest of Bethel Hill. It is also 7.2 miles north of Roxboro.

Demographics
Racial diversity among residents includes 65% White 27% Black, 2% Hispanic and 6% are from two unspecified races. 92% of residents are homeowners while the remaining 8% rent. 24% of residents are age 65 and older. 19% of residents are between 55 and 64, 16% are between the ages of 45 and 54. 12% of adults are between the ages of 35 and 44 and 8% are between the ages of 25 and 34. 9% of residents are between ages of 18 and 24. 12% of children living in the area are usually no older than age 10.
55% of residents living in the area are married. 2% of men are widowed and 2% of women are widowed. 12% of men are divorced and 13% of women are divorced.

Economics
22% of households earn between $100,000 and $200,000. 46% of households earn between $50,000 and $100,000 (reportedly $64,525). 32% of households earn under $50,000.

Education
5% of residents have less than a high school diploma. 38% of residents have a high school diploma or equivalent, 31% of residents have some college experience or an associate degree. 26% of residents have a bachelor's degree.  

The community is served by the Person County School District. Private schools include the Roxboro Christian Academy and the preschool Sneed Academy, both located in Roxboro, NC.

External links
Census Reporter.org
Woodsdale, NC Profile on Niche.com

References

Census-designated places in North Carolina
Census-designated places in Person County, North Carolina